Michael D. Shellenberger (born June 16, 1971) is an American author, journalist, and activist, whose writing has focused on the environment, climate change, nuclear power, and political responses to homelessness, drug addiction and mental illness. He is a co-founder of the Breakthrough Institute and the California Peace Coalition. He is also the founder of Environmental Progress. 

A self-described ecomodernist, Shellenberger believes that economic growth can continue without negative environmental impacts through technological research and development, usually through a combination of nuclear power and urbanization. A controversial figure, Shellenberger disagrees with most environmentalists over the impacts of environmental threats and policies for addressing them. Shellenberger accepts that global warming is occurring, but argues that "it's not the end of the world." Shellenberger's positions and writings on climate change and environmentalism have received criticism from environmental scientists and academics, who have called his arguments "bad science" and "inaccurate". Response to his positions and writings from writers and journalists in the popular press has been mixed. In a similar manner, many academics criticized Shellenberger's positions and writings on homelessness, while receiving mixed reception from writers and journalists in the popular press.

Shellenberger was a Democratic candidate for governor in the 2018 California gubernatorial election, placing ninth in a field of twenty-seven candidates with 0.5% of the vote. In 2021, he supported recalling Governor Gavin Newsom in the 2021 California gubernatorial recall election. Shellenberger ran as a "No Party Preference" candidate in the 2022 gubernatorial election, placing third in a field of twenty-six with 4.1% of the vote.

Education and career
Shellenberger was born and grew up in Colorado. He is a 1989 graduate of Greeley Central High School. He earned a BA degree from the Peace and Global Studies program at Earlham College in 1993. Subsequently, he earned an MA degree in anthropology from the University of California, Santa Cruz in 1996. After graduation, Shellenberger moved to San Francisco to work with Global Exchange, where he founded a number of public relations firms, including "Communication Works," "Lumina Strategies" and "American Environics" with future collaborator Ted Nordhaus. Shellenberger co-founded in 2003 the Breakthrough Institute with Nordhaus. While at Breakthrough, Shellenberger wrote a number of articles with subjects ranging from positive treatment of nuclear energy and shale gas to critiques of the planetary boundaries hypothesis.

In 2008, Time magazine named Shellenberger a Hero of the Environment. 

In February 2016, Shellenberger left Breakthrough and founded Environmental Progress, which is behind several public campaigns to keep nuclear power plants in operation. Shellenberger has also been called by conservative lawmakers to testify before the U.S. Congress about climate change and in favor of nuclear energy.

In December 2022, Shellenberger was one of the authors who released sections of annotated internal Twitter files authorized by new owner Elon Musk.

As of December 2022, he is a writer for The Free Press.

Writing and reception

"The Death of Environmentalism: Global Warming in a Post-Environmental World" 
In 2004, Nordhaus and Shellenberger co-authored "The Death of Environmentalism: Global Warming Politics in a Post-Environmental World." The paper argued that environmentalism is incapable of dealing with climate change and should "die" so that a new politics can be born.

The paper was criticized by members of the mainstream environmental movement. Carl Pope, the former executive director of the Sierra Club, called the essay "unclear, unfair and divisive," claiming it contained multiple factual errors and misinterpretations. However, Adam Werbach, another former Sierra Club president, praised the paper's arguments. John Passacantando, the former Greenpeace executive director, said in 2005 that Shellenberger and Nordhaus "laid out some fascinating data, but they put it in this over-the-top language and did it in this in-your-face way." Michel Gelobter, as well as other environmental experts and academics, wrote The Soul of Environmentalism: Rediscovering transformational politics in the 21st century as a response that criticized "Death" for demanding increased technological innovation instead of addressing the systemic concerns of people of color.

Matthew Yglesias of The New York Times said that "Nordhaus and Shellenberger persuasively argue...environmentalists must stop congratulating themselves for their own willingness to confront inconvenient truths and must focus on building a politics of shared hope rather than relying on a politics of fear." Yglesias added that the "Death" paper "is more convincing in its case for a change in rhetoric."

Break Through: From the Death of Environmentalism to the Politics of Possibility 
In 2007, Shellenberger and Nordhaus published Break Through: From the Death of Environmentalism to the Politics of Possibility. The book is an argument for what its authors describe as a positive, "post-environmental" politics that abandons the environmentalist focus on nature protection for a new focus on technological innovation to create a new economy. They were named Time magazine Heroes of the Environment (2008) after writing the book  and received the 2008 Green Book Award from science journalist John Horgan.

The Wall Street Journal wrote that "(i)f heeded, Nordhaus and Shellenberger's call for an optimistic outlook —- embracing economic dynamism and creative potential —- will surely do more for the environment than any U.N. report or Nobel Prize." NPR's science correspondent Richard Harris listed Break Through on his "recommended reading list" for climate change.

However, environmental scholars Julie Sze and Michael Ziser questioned Shellenberger and Nordhaus's goals in publishing Break Through, noting the "evident relish in their notoriety as the 'sexy'() cosmopolitan 'bad boys' of environmentalism (their own words) introduces some doubt about their sincerity and reliability." Sze and Ziser asserted that Break Through failed "to incorporate the aims of environmental justice while actively trading on suspect political tropes," such as blaming China and other nations as large-scale polluters. Furthermore, Sze and Ziser claim that Shellenberger and Nordhaus advocate technology-based approaches that miss entirely "the "structural environmental injustice" that natural disasters like Hurricane Katrina make visible. Ultimately, "Shellenberger believes that community-based environmental justice poses a threat to the smooth operation of a highly capitalized, global-scale Environmentalism."

Joseph Romm, a former US Department of Energy official now with the Center for American Progress, argued that "(p)ollution limits are far, far more important than R&D for what really matters -- reducing greenhouse-gas emissions and driving clean technologies into the marketplace." Environmental journalist David Roberts, writing in Grist, stated that while the BTI and its founders garner much attention, their policy is lacking, and ultimately they "receive a degree of press coverage that wildly exceeds their intellectual contributions." Reviewers for the San Francisco Chronicle, the American Prospect and the Harvard Law Review argued that a critical reevaluation of green politics was unwarranted because global warming had become a high-profile issue and the Democratic Congress was preparing to act.

An Ecomodernist Manifesto 
In April 2015, Shellenberger joined a group of scholars and Stewart Brand in issuing An Ecomodernist Manifesto. It proposed dropping the goal of "sustainable development" and replacing it with a strategy to shrink humanity's footprint by using natural resources more intensively through technological innovation. The authors argue that economic development is necessary to preserve the environment.

According to The New Yorker, "most of the criticism of [the Manifesto] was more about tone than content. The manifesto's basic arguments, after all, are hardly radical. To wit: technology, thoughtfully applied, can reduce the suffering, human and otherwise, caused by climate change; ideology, stubbornly upheld, can accomplish the opposite." At The New York Times, Eduardo Porter wrote approvingly of ecomodernism's alternative approach to sustainable development. In an article titled "Manifesto Calls for an End to 'People Are Bad' Environmentalism", Slate's Eric Holthaus wrote "It's inclusive, it's exciting, and it gives environmentalists something to fight for for a change."

An Ecomodernist Manifesto was met with critiques similar to Gelobter's evaluation of "Death" and Sze and Ziser's analysis of Break Through. Environmental historian Jeremy Caradonna and environmental economist Richard B. Norgaard led a group of environmental scholars in a critique, arguing that Ecomodernism "violates everything we know about ecosystems, energy, population, and natural resources," and "Far from being an ecological statement of principles, the Manifesto merely rehashes the naïve belief that technology will save us and that human ingenuity can never fail." Further, "The Manifesto suffers from factual errors and misleading statements."

Environmental and Art historian T.J. Demos agreed with Caradonna, and wrote in 2017 that the Manifesto "is really nothing more than a bad utopian fantasy," that functions to support oil and gas industry and as "an apology for nuclear energy." Demos continued that "What is additionally striking about the Ecomodernist document, beyond its factual weaknesses and ecological falsehoods, is that there is no mention of social justice or democratic politics," and "no acknowledgement of the fact that big technologies like nuclear reinforce centralized power, the military-industrial complex, and the inequalities of corporate globalization."

Apocalypse Never: Why Environmental Alarmism Hurts Us All 

In June 2020, Shellenberger published Apocalypse Never: Why Environmental Alarmism Hurts Us All, in which the author argues that climate change is not the existential threat it is portrayed to be in popular media and activism. Rather, he posits that technological innovation, if allowed to continue and grow, will remedy environmental issues. According to Shellenberger, the book "explores how and why so many of us came to see important but manageable environmental problems as the end of the world, and why the people who are the most apocalyptic about environmental problems tend to oppose the best and most obvious solutions to solving them."

Before publication, the book received favorable reviews from climate scientists Tom Wigley and Kerry Emanuel, and from environmentalists such as Steve McCormick and Erle Ellis, but reviews after publication were mixed. For example, Emanuel said that while he did not regret his original positive review, he wished that "the book did not carry with it its own excesses and harmful baggage."

The book has received positive reviews and coverage from conservative and libertarian news outlets and organizations, including Fox News, the Heartland Institute, the Daily Mail, Reason, The Wall Street Journal, National Review, and "climate 'truther' websites". In National Review, Alex Trembath generally praised the book, writing that "despite the flaws", "Shellenberger ... do[es] a service in calling out the environmental alarmism and hysteria that obscure environmental debates rather than illuminate them. And they stand as outliers in those debates for precisely the reason that they claim: Abjuring environmentalist orthodoxy carries heavy social and professional penalties, so few are willing to do so." However, Trembath criticized some of the book as "nuclear fetishism". In The Wall Street Journal, John Tierney, a long-standing critic of environmentalism, wrote that "Shellenberger makes a persuasive case, lucidly blending research data and policy analysis with a history of the green movement and vignettes of people in poor countries suffering the consequences of “environmental colonialism.”" In the Financial Times, Jonathan Ford wrote that the book "provide[s] a corrective to many of the green assumptions that dominate the media. And if they make the world a little more questioning of the next polar bear story, that is no bad thing." In the Scientific American, John Horgan said that "Apocalypse Never will make some green progressives mad. But I see it as a useful and even necessary counterpoint to the alarmism being peddled by some activists and journalists, including me.", but criticized the book for arguing too "aggressively for nuclear power" and added that "my main gripe with Shellenberger isn't that he's too optimistic; it's that he's not optimistic enough." The book also received a positive review from Die Welt.

In contrast, in reviewing Apocalypse Never for Yale Climate Connections, environmental scientist Peter Gleick argued that "bad science and bad arguments abound" in Apocalypse Never, writing that "What is new in here isn't right, and what is right isn't new." In a review for the Los Angeles Review of Books environmental economist Sam Bliss said that while "the book itself is well written", Shellenberger "plays fast and loose with the facts" and "Troublingly, he seems more concerned with showing climate-denying conservatives clever new ways to own the libs than with convincing environmentalists of anything." Similarly, environmental and technological social scientists Taylor Dotson and Michael Bouchey have argued that as an "Environmental activist" and "ecomodernist", Shellenberger's writing in his books and on his foundation's website "bombards readers with facts that are disconnected, out of context, poorly explained, and of questionable relevance," and ultimately, his "fanatic, scientistic discourse stands in the way of nuclear energy policy that is both intelligent and democratic."

A 2020 Forbes article by Shellenberger, in which he promoted Apocalypse Never, was analyzed by seven academic reviewers and one editor from the Climate Feedback fact-checking project. The reviewers conclude that Shellenberger "mixes accurate and inaccurate claims in support of a misleading and overly simplistic argumentation about climate change." Zeke Hausfather, Director of Climate and Energy for The Breakthrough Institute, wrote that Shellenberger "includes a mix of accurate, misleading, and patently false statements. While it is useful to push back against claims that climate change will lead to the end of the world or human extinction, to do so by inaccurately downplaying real climate risks is deeply problematic and counterproductive." The Forbes article was later deleted for violating Forbes' policy against self-promotion. In response, Shellenberger called the deletion censorship and The Daily Wire, Quillette, and Breitbart News re-published all or parts of the article.

San Fransicko: Why Progressives Ruin Cities 

In 2021, Shellenberger published San Fransicko: Why Progressives Ruin Cities, a criticism of progressive social policies.

Manhattan Institute fellow Charles Fain Lehman summarized Shellenberger's topic: "Many major municipalities are marred by violent crime, homelessness, uncontrolled mental illness, and general disorder. This all in spite of an ever-advancing cadre of progressive leaders, who promise their latest tax hike will finally target the 'root causes' of the breakdown." Benjamin Schneider, writing in the San Francisco Examiner, described the book's thesis as "[P]rogressives have embraced 'victimology,' a belief system wherein society’s downtrodden are subject to no rules or consequences for their actions. This ideology, cultivated in cities like San Francisco for decades and widely adopted over the past two years, is the key to understanding, and thus solving, our crises of homelessness, drug overdoses and crime."

Wes Enzinna, writing in The New York Times, charged that Shellenberger "does exactly what he accuses his left-wing enemies of doing: ignoring facts, best practices and complicated and heterodox approaches in favor of dogma." Olga Khazan, writing in The Atlantic, said that "The problem—or opportunity—for Shellenberger is that virtually every homelessness expert disagrees with him. ('Like an internet troll that's written a book' is how Jennifer Friedenbach, the executive director of San Francisco's Coalition on Homelessness, described him to me.)". However, Khazan also noted that "some experts agree with some of Shellenberger's critiques of Housing First. Though they stop short of endorsing Shellenberger or his views". Tim Stanley, writing in The Daily Telegraph, described it as a "revelatory, must-read book", but added "There is much in the argument for liberal readers to contest."

Politics 
Shellenberger worked with left-wing groups in the San Francisco Bay Area in the 1990s, but has since renounced the Democratic Party. On Twitter, he frequently criticizes "wokeism" and critical race theory.

Endorsements 
In the 2021 California gubernatorial recall election, he backed recalling Newsom and endorsed former Mayor of San Diego Kevin Faulconer.

2018 California gubernatorial election 

In November 2017, Shellenberger announced he was running as a Democratic candidate for Governor in the 2018 California gubernatorial election. In a field of 27 candidates, he finished ninth, with 31,692 votes (the winner was Gavin Newsom with 2,343,792 votes).

2022 California gubernatorial election 

Shellenberger ran as an independent in the 2022 gubernatorial election on a platform calling for homelessness reform via removal of encampments and mandatory treatment for drug addiction and mental illness, advocating for water desalination as an answer to California's water shortage, and increasing use of nuclear power, specifically by keeping the Diablo Canyon Power Plant open and building new power plants. Shellenberger placed third in a field of twenty-six with 4.1% of the vote. HuffPost called Shellenberger a "Centrist" and noted his support for "abortion rights, universal health care, gun safety regulation, a $15 minimum wage, collective bargaining rights, and alternatives to incarceration for drug-related crimes". The Wall Street Journal wrote that Shellenberger is a proponent of school choice initiatives.

References

External links 
 Official website
 
 

1971 births
Living people
American political writers
American male non-fiction writers
California Democrats
California Independents
Candidates in the 2018 United States elections
Environmental skepticism
Radical centrist writers
American Mennonites
Mennonite writers
Writers from Colorado